PSKT stands for Persatuan Sepakbola Kota Tomohon (en: Football Association of Tomohon City). PSKT Tomohon is an  Indonesian football club based in Tomohon, North Sulawesi. Club played in Liga 3.

References

External links
Liga-Indonesia.co.id

Tomohon
Football clubs in North Sulawesi
Football clubs in Indonesia